Eastern Suburbs (now known as the Sydney Roosters) competed in the 11th New South Wales Rugby League (NSWRL) premiership in 1918.

Details

 Home Ground: Agricultural Ground
 Lineups:

Results

Premiership Round 1, Saturday 11 May 1918;
Eastern Suburbs 17 defeated Newtown 3 at the Agricultural Ground.
Premiership Round 2, Saturday 18 May 1918;
Eastern Suburbs 8 defeated Western Suburbs 2 at Sydney Cricket Ground.
Premiership Round 3, Saturday 25 May 1918;
Eastern Suburbs 17 defeated Glebe 9 at the Agricultural Ground.
Premiership Round 4, Saturday 1 June 1918;
South Sydney 16( H. Horder 2, Arthur, C. Horder Tries; H. Hallett Goal) defeated Eastern Suburbs 5 at the Agricultural Ground.
Premiership Round 5, Monday 3 June 1918;
North Sydney 16 defeated Eastern Suburbs 8 at the Agricultural Ground.
Premiership Round 6, Saturday 8 June 1918;
Eastern Suburbs 9 defeated Annandale 5 at Wentworth Park.
Premiership Round 7, Saturday 15 June 1918;
Balmain Tigers|Balmain 11 defeated Eastern 	Suburbs 10 at Sydney Cricket Ground.
Premiership Round 8, Monday 24 June 1918;
Eastern Suburbs 20 defeated Newtown 15 at Agricultural Ground.
Premiership Round 9, Saturday 29 June 1918;
Western Suburbs 16 defeated Eastern Suburbs 9 at Sydney Cricket Ground.
Premiership Round 10, Saturday 6 July 1918;
Glebe 18 defeated Eastern Suburbs 5 at Agricultural Ground.
Premiership Round 11, Saturday 13 July 1918;
South Sydney 13( H. Horder, Groves, Kerwick Tries; A. Oxford, H. Horder Goals) defeated Eastern Suburbs 5 at Sydney Cricket Ground.
Premiership Round 12, Saturday 20 July 1918;
????????????????????????????????????
Premiership Round 13, Saturday 27 July 1918;
Eastern Suburbs 15 defeated Annandale 8 at Sydney Cricket Ground.
Premiership Round 14, Saturday 3 August 1918 - Eastern Suburbs 22 defeated Balmain 15 at Agricultural Ground.

Ladder

References

External links
Rugby League Tables and Statistics

Sydney Roosters seasons
East